The Church of St Mary the Virgin, Deane, is an Anglican parish church in Deane, Bolton, Greater Manchester, England. It is a member of Deane deanery in the archdeaconry of Bolton, diocese of Manchester. It is a Grade II* listed building.

History

The church of St Mary is situated in the old township of Rumworth on high ground above the Church Brook, the Saxon Kirkbroke, which flows through Deane Clough to the River Croal. St Mary, or St Mariden was a chapel of ease of St Mary in Eccles before becoming the mother church of the ancient ecclesiastical parish of Deane which was formed from the northern part of the parish of Eccles and takes its name from Deane Clough, the narrow wooded valley close to the west of the church. The church originated as a 14th-century structure consisting of a nave and chancel with a steeply pitched roof and a western tower which has since been considerably enlarged and altered.

Structure
The oldest part of the church is the 14th century west tower which belonged to the older church on the site. The church is built of rough wall-stones with embattled parapets to the chancel, nave, and aisles. It has three crocketed pinnacles at the east end. The windows have rounded uncusped heads to the lights and the clerestory has an almost continuous line of square-headed three-light windows. The chancel has a seven-light pointed east window. The chancel and nave are under a continuous flat-pitched oak panelled roof from 1884 following the lines of the older structure.

In the early 15th century the church was extended by adding a new chancel and later widened by adding the north aisle. Sometime later the church was again extended by adding a third bay, and the south side rebuilt with three arches. The 14th-century nave was pulled down in the early 16th century when a new nave arcade and the clerestory were built.

The tower is  square.

Churchyard

Notable interments include Thomas and Joseph Rowland Heaton, the founders of Lostock Junction Mills.

Other graves include the war graves of 43 service personnel, 15 of World War I and 28 of World War II. There all also 27 graves of victims of the 1910 Pretoria Pit Disaster.

The churchyard also contains a memorial to the Protestant martyr George Marsh which originally stood half a mile to the west of the church on New York Road. Inscriptions on its base record his martyrdom and the erection of the memorial in 1893.

There is also an outdoor stone-built pulpit.

See also

Grade II* listed buildings in Greater Manchester
Listed buildings in Bolton
List of churches in Greater Manchester
Hulton family

References

External links
The History of Deane Parish Church
St Mary the Virgin graves

Deane
Deane
Deane
Saint Mary the Virgin's Church, Deane